Wissadula is a genus of flowering plants in the mallow family, Malvaceae. It contains 
25 to 30 species of herbs and subshrubs that are mostly native to the Neotropics, with several in tropical Asia and Africa.  The name is derived from the Sinhala language.

Selected species 

 Wissadula amplissima (L.) R.E.Fr. – Big yellow velvetleaf
 Wissadula contracta (Link) R.E.Fr. – Contracted velvetleaf
 Wissadula diffusa R.E.Fr.
 Wissadula divergens (Benth.) Benth. & Hook.
 Wissadula periplocifolia (L.) K.Presl ex Thwaites – White velvetleaf

Formerly placed here 
 Briquetia spicata (Kunth) Fryxell (as W. spicata (Kunth) C.Presl)

References

External links 
 Encyclopedia of Life entry

 
Malvaceae genera
Taxonomy articles created by Polbot